Robert Dixon Herman (September 24, 1911 – April 5, 1990) was a United States district judge of the United States District Court for the Middle District of Pennsylvania.

Education and career

Born in Northumberland, Pennsylvania, Herman received an Artium Baccalaureus degree from Bucknell University in 1935 and a Bachelor of Laws from Cornell Law School in 1938. He was in private practice in Dauphin County, Pennsylvania between 1938 and 1958, and was an assistant district attorney of Dauphin County from 1942 to 1944. He was a United States Naval Reserve Lieutenant for the JAG Corps at the end of World War II, from 1944 to 1946. He was a member of the Pennsylvania House of Representatives from 1948 to 1950, and was a solicitor for Dauphin County from 1950 to 1957. Herman was a Republican. He was a judge of the Dauphin County Court of Common Pleas from 1957 to 1970, and of the Dauphin County Juvenile Court from 1965 to 1970.

Federal judicial service

On October 2, 1969, Herman was nominated by President Richard Nixon to a seat on the United States District Court for the Middle District of Pennsylvania vacated by Judge Frederick Voris Follmer. Herman was confirmed by the United States Senate on December 10, 1969, and received his commission the following day. He assumed senior status on September 25, 1981, serving in that capacity until his death on April 5, 1990, in Harrisburg, Pennsylvania.

References

Sources
 

1911 births
1990 deaths
People from Northumberland, Pennsylvania
Bucknell University alumni
Cornell Law School alumni
Military personnel from Pennsylvania
United States Navy Judge Advocate General's Corps
United States Navy officers
Judges of the Pennsylvania Courts of Common Pleas
Republican Party members of the Pennsylvania House of Representatives
Judges of the United States District Court for the Middle District of Pennsylvania
United States district court judges appointed by Richard Nixon
20th-century American judges
20th-century American politicians